Alexey Fomenkov (Russian: Алексей Алексеевич Фоменков) is a paralympic swimmer from Russia competing mainly in category SB6 events.

Fomenkov competed at the 2008 Summer Paralympics in Beijing. He set a games record in winning the 100m breaststroke, finished fourth in the 100m backstroke and was part of the Russian 4x50m breaststroke team that was disqualified in the heats.

References

External links
 

Paralympic swimmers of Russia
Swimmers at the 2008 Summer Paralympics
Paralympic gold medalists for Russia
Living people
Year of birth missing (living people)
Medalists at the 2008 Summer Paralympics
Paralympic medalists in swimming
Russian male backstroke swimmers
Russian male breaststroke swimmers
S8-classified Paralympic swimmers
20th-century Russian people
21st-century Russian people